Archibald Crawford, 1st Baron Hungarton (12 September 1890 – 14 June 1966), was a British businessman.

Crawford was the son of Robert Crawford, of Highfields Farm, Lowesby, Leicestershire, and was educated at the Wyggeston Grammar School for Boys in Leicester. He later became managing director of Crawford, Prince and Johnston Ltd, agricultural equipment manufacturers, of Lyston, Leicestershire. 

In 1951, he was raised to the peerage as Baron Hungarton, of Hungarton in the County of Leicester, in recognition of his "political and public services in Leicestershire".

Lord Hungarton married Jean Johnstone, daughter of David Johnstone, of Castle Douglas, Kirkcudbrightshire, in 1914. They had one son, Squadron-Leader David Robert Crawford, who was killed in action over Germany in February 1945, and a daughter, the Honourable Grace Crawford. Hungarton died in June 1966, aged 75, when the title became extinct.

Arms

References

External links

1890 births
1966 deaths
People educated at Wyggeston Grammar School for Boys
People from Harborough District
Conservative Party (UK) hereditary peers
Barons created by George VI